Jal-jeera is an Indian beverage. It is flavored with a spice mix known as jal-jeera powder. In Hindi, "jal" means water and "jeera" means cumin. The beverage base is either lemonade or similar tangy drinks and jaljira spices, and is a popular summer drink in India. It is sometimes served as an appetizer, as it is intended to "startle" the taste buds.

Jaljira spices generally consist of cumin, ginger, black pepper, mint, black salt, some fruit powder (usually either mango, or some kind of citrus zest), and chili or hot pepper powder.

History and culture
Jaljeera has a very long history, originating on the banks of the Ganges river. At one time, the powder was ground on stone slabs, and stored in clay pots.

The cumin is a medicinal ingredient which aids digestion. The mint has a cooling effect. Black salt or rock salt acts as a digestive.

Jaljeera is popular in northern India because it is thought to have cooling properties, against the temperature of the region.

See also

 Jeera water
 List of Indian beverages

References

Indian drinks
Traditional medicine in India